Santana is a metro station on São Paulo Metro Line 1-Blue, located in the district of Santana, in São Paulo. It was opened on 26 September 1975. For more than 20 years, it was the terminus for the line in its north branch.

Location

It is located in an area known as Centro de Santana, in Avenida Cruzeiro do Sul, 3173, in the district of Santana, North Side of São Paulo.

In 1964, Santana station of the Cantareira Tramway was demolished, originally built in 1895 and located in Rua Alfredo Pujol between Rua Voluntários da Pátria and Avenida Cruzeiro do Sul, exactly in the center of the corner, on the right side towards Cantareira, not so far from the current metro station.

Characteristics
It is an elevated station made of apparent concrete, with prefabricated cover in concrete and side platforms. It has 2 levels, being one on the underground (with access to a bus terminal), gates and ticket offices, and another one for the platforms, with escalators and staircases serving as connection between the levels. It has  of built area.

It has three exits, the first on the corner of Avenida Cruzeiro do Sul with Rua Leite de Morais, the second one next to EESG Padre Antônio Vieira, in the corner with Rua Dr. Gabriel Piza (these two to west of the line), and the third one inside Santana Bus Terminal, located east to the station. The station also has an elevator for access for people with disabilities.

The station has capacity for 30,000 passengers per hour during peak hours.

The station also has the most extensive escalators of the system, which goes from under the avenue until the elevated platforms.

References

São Paulo Metro stations
Railway stations opened in 1975
1975 establishments in Brazil